Garrie is a masculine given name. Notable people with the name include:

 Garrie Cooper (1935–1982), Australian racing driver
 Garrie Gibson (born 1954), Australian politician
 Garrie Thompson (1927–2018), record label owner, producer, and band manager

Masculine given names